Gräfenberg Castle is the older of two former castles in Gräfenberg in the Upper Franconian county of Forchheim in the south German state of Bavaria. Today, there is little left of the castle; it is classed as a burgstall and the site is in the area of Bahnhofstraße 11 to 21.
The castle was first recorded in the year 1477; its last remains were removed from about 1563.

Literature 
 Robert Giersch, Andreas Schlunk, Berthold Frhr. von Haller: Burgen und Herrensitze in der Nürnberger Landschaft. Altnürnberger Landschaft, Lauf an der Pegnitz, 2006, pp. 141–142.

External links 
 Burg Gräfenberg at "www.herrensitze.com"
 

Castles in Bavaria
Gräfenberg, Bavaria